Banff-Cochrane was a provincial electoral district in Alberta, Canada, mandated to return a single member to the Legislative Assembly of Alberta from 1940 to 1975, and again from 1979 to 2019.

The Banff-Cochrane electoral district is home to the town of Banff and the popular tourist destination Banff National Park, environmental issues tend to dominate here.

The cost of living is significantly high especially in Canmore where there is a struggle to fill low wage service sector jobs, due to the high cost of living. Bears and wildlife encounters are also common in this riding, requiring extra attention to waste disposal. The area has many ski resorts and a number of ranchers and farmers make their home in the Alberta Foothills.

The riding was first created in 1940 out of the north half of the old Rocky Mountain riding, and the Cochrane riding. From 1975 to 1979 the riding was renamed Banff but was later reversed.

History
The electoral district has existed twice. The first iteration was created in the 1940 boundary re-distribution from the electoral districts of Cochrane and Rocky Mountain. In 1975 the riding name was changed to Banff and it was set back to Banff-Cochrane in the 1977 re-distribution.

The 2010 electoral boundary re-distribution saw Banff-Cochrane gain the land south of Cochrane that was in the old Foothills-Rocky View electoral district.

The Banff-Cochrane electoral district was dissolved in the 2017 electoral boundary re-distribution, and portions of the district would form the newly created Banff-Kananaskis and Airdrie-Cochrane electoral districts.

Boundary history

Electoral history
The electoral district was created in the 1940 boundary redistribution primarily from the ridings of Cochrane and Rocky Mountain. The first representative to win the district was Independent candidate Frant Laut who defeated former Cochrane Social Credit incumbent William King in a hotly contested race.

Laut was defeated running for a second term in the 1944 general election by Social Credit candidate Arthur Wray. Two years into his term Wray was suspended by the Social Credit caucus on February 20, 1946 for criticizing the Alberta government after requests to the Public Works department to remove snow from Cochrane roads was ignored. The situation came to a head a year later when the Social Credit members passed a motion in the legislature to force Wray to move his desk to the opposition side of the house. His stand against cabinet won praise from his constituents in Cochrane.

The 1948 election would see a hotly contested battle as King and Laut attempt to regain their seat. Wray hung on to a second term in vote transfers. Wray would run for a third term in the 1952 election but would be defeated finishing a distant third by Social Credit candidate Lee Leavitt.

Leavitt was defeated by Frank Gainer who was one of two joint nominee's by the Progressive Conservative and Liberal parties in the 1955 election. He ran with the Coalition banner and sat in the legislature with it. Gainer won re-election in a hotly contested race in 1959. Pundits at the time figured he would be chosen to lead the four opposition members of different stripes with his Coalition banner, however no one was picked. He won a third term in 1963 before retiring in 1967.

The wide open race in 1967 saw Independent candidate Clarence Copithorne defeat Social Credit candidate Roy Wilson to win the district. Copithorne joined the Progressive Conservative caucus on April 15, 1971. He stood for reelection as a Progressive Conservative a few months later winning a strong plurality. He retired from provincial politics at dissolution in 1975.

In 1975 the riding name was changed to Banff before being changed back in 1979. Progressive Conservative candidate Greg Stevens held the district for three terms before retiring in 1993. He was replaced by Brian Evans for two terms. Janis Tarchuck was elected in 2001 and served until 2012 when she was replaced by Ron Casey. Ron Casey would be defeated by NDP member Cameron Westhead in the 2015 general election.

Legislature results 1940–1975

1940 general election

1944 general election

1948 general election

1952 general election

1955 general election

1959 general election

1963 general election

1967 general election

1971 general election

Legislature results 1979–2015

1979 general election

1982 general election

1986 general election

1989 general election

1993 general election

1997 general election

2001 general election

2004 general election

2008 general election

2012 general election

2015 general election

Senate nominee results

2004 Senate nominee election district results

Voters had the option of selecting 4 candidates on the ballot.

Plebiscite district results

1948 electrification plebiscite
District data for the 1948 electrification plebiscite

1957 liquor plebiscite

On October 30, 1957 a stand-alone plebiscite was held province wide in all 50 of the then current provincial electoral districts in Alberta. The government decided to consult Alberta voters to decide on liquor sales and mixed drinking after a divisive debate in the legislature. The plebiscite was intended to deal with the growing demand for reforming antiquated liquor control laws.

The plebiscite was conducted in two parts. Question A, asked in all districts, asked the voters if the sale of liquor should be expanded in Alberta, while Question B, asked in a handful of districts within the corporate limits of Calgary and Edmonton, asked if men and women should be allowed to drink together in establishments. Question B was slightly modified depending on which city the voters were in.

Province wide Question A of the plebiscite passed in 33 of the 50 districts while Question B passed in all five districts. Banff-Cochrane voted overwhelmingly in favor of the plebiscite. The district recorded a slightly above average voter turnout, a few points above the province wide 46% average. The landslide in favour of Question A was attributed to recognition of the tourist industry in Banff and the national parks.

Banff-Cochrane also voted on question B1 with a number of residents lying inside the electoral district within the corporate limits of Calgary. Residents voted for mixed drinking with a super majority. Turnout for question B was also quite high.

Official district returns were released to the public on December 31, 1957. The Social Credit government in power at the time did not consider the results binding. However the results of the vote led the government to repeal all existing liquor legislation and introduce an entirely new Liquor Act.

Municipal districts lying inside electoral districts that voted against the plebiscite were designated Local Option Zones by the Alberta Liquor Control Board and considered effective dry zones. Business owners who wanted a license had to petition for a binding municipal plebiscite in order to be granted a license.

1967 Daylight Saving plebiscite
District data from the 1967 Daylight Saving plebiscite

1971 Daylight Saving plebiscite
District data from the 1971 Daylight Saving plebiscite

Student vote results

2004 election

On November 19, 2004 a student vote was conducted at participating Alberta schools to parallel the 2004 Alberta general election results. The vote was designed to educate students and simulate the electoral process for persons who have not yet reached the legal majority. The vote was conducted in 80 of the 83 provincial electoral districts with students voting for actual election candidates. Schools with a large student body that reside in another electoral district had the option to vote for candidates outside of the electoral district than where they were physically located.

2012 election

See also
List of Alberta provincial electoral districts

References

Further reading

External links
Elections Alberta
The Legislative Assembly of Alberta
Current Riding Map Banff-Cochrane
Alberta Heritage - election results 1905 – 2001 and riding distribution data
Pete Helfrich for Banff-Cochrane

Former provincial electoral districts of Alberta
Banff, Alberta
Canmore, Alberta